This is a list of notable first wave punk rock musicians (1975–1979).

0-9

4 Skins
45 Grave
999

A
Abrasive Wheels
Adam & the Ants
The Adicts
Adolescents (band)
The Adverts
Agent Orange (band)
The Alley Cats (Los Angeles)
Alternative TV
Amazorblades
Amebix
Angelic Upstarts
Angry Samoans
Anti-Nowhere League
Anti-Pasti
Au Pairs
The Avengers
Art Attacks

B
Bad Brains
Bags
Big Balls and the Great White Idiot
Big Boys
Big in Japan
Black Flag
Black Randy and the Metrosquad
Blitzkrieg Bop
The Blockheads
Blondie
The Boomtown Rats
The Boys
Bush Tetras
The Business
Buzzcocks

C
Catholic Discipline
Cardiac Kidz
Channel 3
Charged GBH
Chelsea
The Cheifs
Cherry Vanilla
China White
Christian Death
Chrome
Chron Gen
Circle Jerks
Circus Mort
The Clash
Cock Sparrer
Cockney Rejects
James Chance and the Contortions
The Controllers
The Cortinas
The Cramps
Crass
Crime
Crime & the City Solution

D

The Damned
Darby Crash
The Dead Boys
Dead Kennedys
Death (protopunk band)
Defunkt
Descendents
Desperate Bicycles
Devo
The Dickies
The Dictators
The Dils
The Diodes
Discharge
Disorder
Diverse Opera
DMZ
DNA
D.O.A.
The Dogs
Destroy All Monsters
The Drones
Ian Dury

E
The East Coast Angels
Eater
Ebba Grön
Eddie and the Hot Rods
The Electric Eels
Elvis Costello and the Attractions
The Exploited
Elton Motello

F
Faith No More
The Fall
Fang
Fatal Microbes
The Fast
Fastbacks
Fear
The Feederz
Flamin' Groovies
The Flesh Eaters
The Fleshtones
The Flowers of Romance
Flyboys
Forgotten Rebels
Flipper
The Flys (UK band)
The Freeze

G 
Gang of Four
Generation X
The Germs
GG Allin
The Go-Gos
The Gun Club

H
The Heartbreakers
Hüsker Dü
The Hollywood Squares

I
Iggy Pop
The Innocents

J
The Jam
Jayne County
The Jerks
Joan Jett
Johnny Moped

K
The Killjoys
Kommunity FK
KSMB
The Kids (Belgian band)

L
Leisure Class
LiLiPUT
London 
London SS
The Lurkers
The Last
Lydia Lunch

M
Magazine
The Mau-Mau's
MC5
The Mekons
The Mentally Ill
The Members
The Membranes
Mentors
Métal Urbain
MDC
Middle Class
Milk ‘N’ Cookies
Mink DeVille
Minutemen
Misfits
Misspent Youth (band)
Mission of Burma
Jon Moss
The Mutants

N
Necros
Negative Trend
Neon Boys
Nervous Gender
New York Dolls
Nina Hagen Band
The Nipple Erectors
The Now
The Nuns
Neo (British band)

O
The Offs
The Only Ones
The Outsiders
The Outcasts (Belfast band)

P
The Pagans
Patti Smith
The Partisans
Pere Ubu
Penetration
Peter and the Test Tube Babies
The Plague
Plasmatics
Poison Idea
Poison Girls
Pork Dukes
The Prefects
Public Image Ltd
Punishment of Luxury
Pure Hell
The Punks
Pylon

Q
? and the Mysterians

R
Radio Birdman
Radio Stars
Ramones
The Reactionaries
Really Red
The Replacements
The Rezillos
Rhino 39
Riff Regan
Rikki and the Last Days of Earth
Riot/Clone
Rocket from the Tombs
The Ruts
The Radiators from Space
The Runaways

S
The Saints
Scars
The Screamers
Sex Pistols
Sham 69
The 
Shapes
Shattered Faith
The Shirts
Siouxsie and the Banshees
The Sillies
Skids
Skrewdriver
The Skulls
Slaughter & The Dogs
The Slits
Sniper
Social Distortion
Sonic’s Rendezvous Band
The Specials
Special Duties
The Spitfire Boys
Spizzenergi
Splodgenessabounds
Steve Bjorklund
Stiff Little Fingers
Stinky Toys
The Stooges
The Stranglers
Subhumans
Suburban Lawns
Suburban Studs
Subway Sect
Suicide
The Suicide Commandos
Swell Maps

T
T.S.O.L.
The Table
Teenage Head
Teenage Jesus and the Jerks
The Teen Idles
Television
Talking Heads
Toy Dolls
Toxic Reasons
The Tubes
Tubeway Army
Tuff Darts
Tuxedomoon

U
U.K. Subs
The Undertones
Ultravox
Urinals

V
The Vandals
The Varukers
Venus and the Razorblades
The Vibrators
Vice Squad
The Viletones
Void
(Richard Hell and) the Voidoids
VOM

W
Wayne County & the Electric Chairs
The Weirdos
Wipers
Wire

X
X (American band)
X (Australia)
XTC
X-Ray Spex

Z
Zero Boys
The Zeros (UK)
The Zeros (US)
Zolar X
 Zounds

Lists of punk bands

af:Lys van musikante in die eerste golf van punkmusiek
et:Inglise punkansamblite loend
fi:Luettelo englantilaisista punk-yhtyeistä